"I'm Dying Soon" is the sixth episode of the fifth season of the South Korean anthology series KBS Drama Special. Starring Oh Jung-se and Kim Seul-gi, it aired on KBS2 on  March 16, 2014.

Synopsis

Cast 
Oh Jung-se as Choi Woo-jin
Kim Seul-gi as Sa-rang
Kim Ji-hyun as Min-hee
Jo Hyun-sik as Byung-hoon
Lee So-yoon as Ga-yeon
Choi Deok-moon as Doctor
Yoo Hyung-kwan as Doctor
Kook Ki-hoon as Lawyer

Awards and nominations

References

External links 
 I'm Dying Soon official KBS website 
 KBS Drama Special at KBS World
 I'll Be Dead Soon at Hancinema

2014 South Korean television episodes